Heliothis roseivena is a species of moth of the family Noctuidae. It is found in the Northern Territory, Queensland and Western Australia and on Lombok and Flores in Indonesia.

The wingspan is about 25 mm.

External links
 Australian Caterpillars
 Australian Faunal Directory

Heliothis
Moths described in 1866